In the run up to the 2023 Slovak parliamentary election, various organisations carry out opinion polling to gauge voting intention in Slovakia. Results of such polls are displayed in this article. The date range for these opinion polls are from the previous parliamentary election, held on 29 February 2020, to the present day.

The current parliament was elected on 29 February 2020. The next parliamentary election is scheduled to be held 30 September 2023.

Electoral polling

Graphical summary

Voting intention estimates 
Voting intention estimates made by polling firms that are members of the European Society for Opinion and Marketing Research (ESOMAR) and the Slovak Association of Research Agencies (SAVA). They are conducted in the form of telephone and personal interviews with selected persons, who form a representative sample reflecting the demographic parameters of the population of Slovakia. Respondents are asked: "Imagine that a parliamentary election would be held in Slovakia next Saturday. Would you vote in them and if so, which party would you vote for?" Respondents are read a list of currently active political parties.

Results are published that include only the answers of respondents who would vote for a particular party. The table shows political parties that have exceeded the electoral threshold in the last parliamentary election or oscillate above 4% in the polls. The electoral threshold is 5% for a single party, 7% for two-, three-party alliances; 10% for four-or-more party alliance. 76 seats are required for an absolute majority in the National council.

2023

2022

2021

Leadership polling

Confidence rating

Notes

References 

Opinion polling in Slovakia
Slovakia